Lyudmyla Oleksandrivna Nazarova (published as L. A. Nazarova and also spelled Liudmila, Ludmila, or Lyudmila; born 14 May 1938 in Vologda, RSFSR) is a Ukrainian mathematician specializing in linear algebra and representation theory.

Research
With her husband, Andrei Vladimirovich Roiter, Nazarova founded the theory of representations of and differentiation of partially ordered sets, and solved the second Brauer–Thrall conjecture, proving what became known as the Nazarova–Roiter theorem.
Her research has also included pioneering work on representations of quivers, and on the wild problem in matrix classification.

Education and career
Lyudmila Nazarova was born in a family of matematician Olxander Nazarov.
Nazarova began her studies at Taras Shevchenko National University of Kyiv, where she met Roiter. Together they transferred to Leningrad State University, where Nazarova completed her doctorate as a student of Dmitry Faddeev. They returned to Kiev, and Nazarova became a researcher in the Institute of Mathematics of the Academy of Sciences of Ukraine, now the National Academy of Sciences of Ukraine. She has since retired.

Selected publications

References

1938 births
Living people
Ukrainian mathematicians
Ukrainian women mathematicians
Saint Petersburg State University alumni